Nuclear energetics may refer to:
 Nuclear physics
 High energy nuclear physics
 Nuclear energy (disambiguation)